See Here, Private Hargrove is a 1944 black-and-white comedy film from MGM, produced by George Haight, directed by Wesley Ruggles, and starring Robert Walker, Donna Reed, and Keenan Wynn. The film was adapted from the 1942 memoir of the same name by Marion Hargrove.

The film was followed by a 1945 sequel, What Next, Corporal Hargrove?, which followed Hargrove to France.

Plot
The storyline unfolds as a series of humorous anecdotes about Marion Hargrove's tenure in the U.S. Army while at boot camp in Fort Bragg, NC during the early days of World War II.

Cast

 Robert Walker as Pvt. Marion Hargrove
 Donna Reed as Carol Holliday
 Keenan Wynn as Pvt. Mulvehill
 Grant Mitchell as Uncle George
 Ray Collins as Brody S. Griffith
 Chill Wills as First Sgt. Cramp
 Bob Crosby as Bob
 Marta Linden as Mrs. Holliday
 George Offerman Jr. as Pvt. Orrin Esty
 Edward Fielding as Gen. Dillon
 Donald Curtis as Sgt. Heldon
 William Phillips as Pvt. Bill Burk (as Wm. 'Bill' Phillips)
 Douglas Fowley as Capt. R.S. Manville
 Robert Benchley as Mr. Holliday

References

External links 
 
 
 
 

1944 films
1940s war comedy films
American black-and-white films
American war comedy films
Films based on non-fiction books
Films directed by Wesley Ruggles
Films set in North Carolina
Films set on the home front during World War II
Metro-Goldwyn-Mayer films
Military humor in film
Films with screenplays by Harry Kurnitz
World War II films made in wartime
1944 comedy films
1940s English-language films